Screaming Target is the debut album by Jamaican deejay Big Youth. It was recorded and originally released in 1972 on the Gussie and Jaguar labels in Jamaica. It was issued in the United Kingdom in 1973 by Trojan Records.

Recording and production 
The album was produced by Big Youth's childhood friend Augustus "Gussie" Clarke. Some of the tracks on the album had previously been hits as singles, including "Screaming Target", which used K.C. White's "No, No, No" rhythm, "Tippertone Rock" (though the single version was different), and "The Killer". Several other tracks employed rhythms from Clarke's other productions, including Leroy Smart's "Pride & Ambition" (on "Pride & Joy Rock"), Lloyd Parks' "Slaving" ("Honesty"), Dennis Brown's "In Their Own Way" ("Be Careful"), and Gregory Isaacs' "One One Cocoa Fill Basket" (on "One of These Fine Days"). The 2006 CD reissue adds the aforementioned tracks and more as a bonus.

Critical reception 

The album was a favorite dub LP for music critic Robert Christgau in the 1970s, although he omitted it from Christgau's Record Guide: Rock Albums of the Seventies (1981), lacking the comprehensiveness for import-only albums at the time.

Track listing
All tracks written, arranged, and produced by Gussie Clarke.

The track "Tippertone Rock" is listed as "Tippertong Rock" on the cover of the 1973 Trojan Records release (TRLS 61-A), while it's listed as "Tippertone Rock" on the vinyl LP itself.  Later releases added "Screaming Target (Version 2)" (as track 6) and "Concrete Jungle" (as track 12).  The 1976 Gussie LP releases only added "Concrete Jungle" (as track 11).

Credits
 Vocals : Big Youth
 Backing vocals : Dennis Brown, Gregory Isaacs, K.C. White

Recording Information
 Recording : Dynamic Sounds (Kingston, JA) & Randy's (Kingston, JA) & Harry J (Kingston, JA)
 Engineers : Karl Pitterson & Sid Bucknor & Errol Thompson

References

1972 albums
Big Youth albums
Trojan Records albums